"Do You See What I See?" is the fourteenth single by Australian pub rock band Hunters & Collectors, released in 1987.  It was released ahead of the album in August 1987 in both 7" and 12" formats. It was released as the first single from Hunters & Collectors fifth album What's a Few Men?. "Do You See What I See?" peaked at number 33 on the ARIA Charts and at number 13 on the Recorded Music NZ.

Track listing

Personnel 
 John Archer – bass guitar
 Doug Falconer – drums
 John 'Jack' Howard – trumpet
 Robert Miles – live sound, art director
 Mark Seymour – vocals, lead guitar
 Jeremy Smith – French horn
 Michael Waters – trombone, keyboards

Recording details
 Producer – Hunters & Collectors, Greg Edward
 Engineer – Greg Edward
 Assistant engineer – Leanne Vallence
 Recording/mixing engineer – Robert Miles, Greg Edward

Charts

References 

Hunters & Collectors songs
1987 singles
1987 songs
Mushroom Records singles
Songs written by Mark Seymour